James White (June 16, 1749 – October, 1809) was an American physician, lawyer, and politician. He was an early settler at Nashville, Tennessee and in Louisiana. He was a member of the Province of North Carolina House of Burgesses and a delegate for North Carolina in the Continental Congress and a non-voting member of the U.S. House for the Southwest Territory.  In historical writings, he is usually referred to as "Dr. James White" to distinguish him from General James White, the founder of Knoxville, Tennessee.

White was born into a prosperous mercantile family in Philadelphia, Pennsylvania, the son of Anne (Willcox) and James White. His early education was at the College of St. Omer, a Jesuit school in modern-day France (then part of the Austrian Netherlands). When he returned he entered the University of Pennsylvania and studied medicine and law. After graduating he moved to the Province of North Carolina.

In 1785, White was elected to the North Carolina House of Representatives. In 1786, North Carolina sent him as a delegate to the Continental Congress where he served until 1788. Late in 1786, Congress named him Superintendent of Indian Affairs for the southern department. After that he was frequently absent from Congress, traveling the Carolina and Georgia frontiers negotiating with the Indian tribes. After his congressional service he moved to the frontier, buying land and settling in what became Nashville, Tennessee.

When the Southwest Territory's legislature was formed in 1794, White was selected as its delegate to the United States House of Representatives, serving from 1794 to 1796. After Tennessee gained statehood in 1796, he returned home to Davidson County.

James White was fluent in French and Spanish. In the 1780s he had become involved with John Sevier's plan to place the State of Franklin under Spanish rule. He used his position and travels as Indian superintendent to serve as agent conducting negotiations between Sevier and the governor of Spanish Louisiana. In the 1790s he was involved in William Blount's plan to work with the Indians and Britain in staging an invasion of Spanish Florida. As his role in these schemes became known, he moved to the Spanish territory of New Orleans in 1799, settling in what later became St. Martin Parish, Louisiana.

While his earlier actions caused problems in Tennessee, they weren't widely known. When the United States expansion reached him again President Jefferson named him as a territorial judge in 1804, initially for the District of Louisiana, and then for the Territory of Orleans. His family prospered in Louisiana. His son, (Edward Douglass White Sr.), was Governor of Louisiana. His grandson, Edward Douglass White, served as Chief Justice of the United States.

James White died at home in 1809 in St. James Parish, Louisiana.

References

External links

1749 births
1809 deaths
18th-century American politicians
18th-century spies
Continental Congressmen from North Carolina
Delegates to the United States House of Representatives from Territory South of the River Ohio
Members of the North Carolina House of Burgesses
Members of the North Carolina House of Representatives
People from the State of Franklin